This is the discography of Natalia Oreiro, a Uruguayan pop-rock singer. Oreiro has released three studio albums, six reissues albums, three soundtrack albums, twenty four singles (including five as a featured artist), three charity singles and sixteen music videos. She first appeared on the tracks "Que sí, que sí" and "Caminos" for the soundtrack Un Argentino En New York in 1998.

Oreiro's debut album, Natalia Oreiro, was released on 14 July 1998. The album peaked at No. 1 in Czech Republic, Hungary, Slovakia and at No. 4 in Grece. It spawned five singles: "Que sí, que sí", "De tu amor", "Cambio dolor", "Me muero de amor" and "Huracán". The album was reissued five times as especial editions in Argentina, Poland, Czech Republic, Hungary and Israel, incorporating remixes to the original tracklist and a DVD with live performances and the music videos of the singles.

Albums

Studio albums

Compilation albums

Soundtracks

Extended plays

Singles

As lead artist

As featured artist

Charity singles

Other appearances

References

Latin pop music discographies
Discographies of Uruguayan artists